Nidara is a genus of moths belonging to the subfamily Drepaninae from Madagascar.

Species
Nidara calligola Watson, 1965
Nidara croceina Mabille, 1898
Nidara marcus Watson, 1965
Nidara multiversa Watson, 1965
Nidara pumilla Watson, 1965

References

Mabille, 1898 . Annales de la Société Entomologique de France 66: 222
Watson 1965a. A revision of the Ethiopian Drepanidae (Lepidoptera). - Bulletin of the British Museum of natural History (Entomology) Supplement 3:1–178, pls. 1–18.

Drepaninae
Drepanidae genera